Tayler Anthony Persons (born August 31, 1995) is an American basketball player for Twarde Pierniki Toruń of the Polish Basketball League (PLK). Persons for Northern Kentucky and Ball State before heading overseas to play professionally.

College career
Persons played his freshman season at Northern Kentucky. He averaged 13.1 points, 4.6 rebounds and 3.7 assists per game and was named Atlantic Sun Freshman of the Year. Following the season, he transferred to Ball State. Persons was the first player ever for the Ball State Cardinals to finish his career with 1,000 points and 400 assists. He left the Cardinals as ninth leading scorer all-time and third highest assists total. As a senior, he led Ball State in scoring at 16.7 points per game and in assists at 4.3 per game, and was named to the Third Team All-MAC.

Professional career
On July 17, 2019, Persons signed a one-year contract with ZZ Leiden of the Dutch Basketball League (DBL). The 2019–20 season was prematurely abandoned in March after the COVID-19 pandemic outbreak. Persons finished the season as the assists leader in the league. He averaged 18.6 points, 4.5 rebounds, 8.1 assists and 1.5 steals per game and was named to the All-FIBA Europe Cup team.

On July 8, 2020, he has signed with s.Oliver Würzburg of the Basketball Bundesliga.

On January 9, 2021, he has signed with GTK Gliwice of the PLK. Persons averaged 13.4 points, 4.3 rebounds, 5.8 assists and 1.2 steals per game. On August 20, 2021, he signed with Szedeák of the Nemzeti Bajnokság I/A.

On August 24, 2022, he has signed with Élan Chalon of the French Pro B.

On February 19, 2023, he signed with Twarde Pierniki Toruń of the Polish Basketball League (PLK).

The Basketball Tournament
Persons joined War Tampa, a team composed primarily of Auburn alumni in The Basketball Tournament 2020. He scored four points in a 76–53 loss to House of 'Paign in the first round.

Honours

Individual
DBL assists leader: 2019–20

References

External links
Northern Kentucky Norse bio
Ball State Cardinals bio

1995 births
Living people
American expatriate basketball people in Hungary
American expatriate basketball people in the Netherlands
American men's basketball players
Ball State Cardinals men's basketball players
Basketball players from Indiana
B.S. Leiden players
Dutch Basketball League players
Élan Chalon players
Northern Kentucky Norse men's basketball players
Point guards
Sportspeople from Kokomo, Indiana
SZTE-Szedeák players
Twarde Pierniki Toruń players
ZZ Leiden players